The Aviation Service Act is a U.S. law passed in 1914. It created within the Signal Corps an Aviation Section to replace the Aeronautical Division. It directed the Aviation Section to operate and supervise "all military [U.S. Army] aircraft, including balloons and aeroplanes, all appliances pertaining to said craft, and signaling apparatus of any kind when installed on said craft." The section would also train "officers and enlisted men in matters pertaining to military aviation," and thus embraced all facets of the Army's air organization and operation. The old Aeronautical Division continued to exist, but operated as the Washington office of the new section.

See also
1914 in aviation
Aviation Act of 1917

References 

63rd United States Congress
Aviation in the United States
Aviation law